Mexican War may refer to:
Mexican War of Independence (1810–21)
Mexican–American War (1846–48)
Second French intervention in Mexico (1861–67)
Mexican Revolution (1910–20)
Cristero War (1926–1929)

See also
List of wars involving Mexico
Mexican Drug War